The 1904 Oklahoma A&M Aggies football team represented Oklahoma A&M College in the 1904 college football season. This was the fourth year of football at A&M and the team did not have a head coach. The Aggies played their home games in Stillwater, Oklahoma Territory. They finished the season 0–6. The Aggies did not score a point all season. This season also marked their first game against the Oklahoma Sooners, their longest tenured rival, in the Bedlam Game.

Schedule

References

Oklahoma AandM
Oklahoma State Cowboys football seasons
College football winless seasons
Oklahoma AandM Aggies football